Feria de Madrid (previously Campo de las Naciones) is a station on Line 8 of the Madrid Metro. It is located in fare Zone A. It gives service to IFEMA, an event center which holds, among other trade fairs, the Cibeles Madrid Fashion Week. It's also next to Parque Juan Carlos I, one of the most important parks in Madrid.

The name of the station was changed to Feria de Madrid in June 2017.

References 

Line 8 (Madrid Metro) stations
Railway stations in Spain opened in 1998
Buildings and structures in Barajas District, Madrid